Starch Factory Creek flows into the Mohawk River in Utica, New York.

References

Rivers of New York (state)
Rivers of Oneida County, New York
Rivers of Herkimer County, New York